The 2013 Trinidad and Tobago Charity Shield (known as the Digicel Charity Shield for sponsorship reasons) was the second edition of the Charity Shield, which is a football match that opened the 2013–14 Pro League season. The match was played on 6 September 2013, between the winners of the previous season's TT Pro League and Pro Bowl competitions. The match was a rematch of the inaugural Charity Shield contested by the 2013 Pro Bowl winners, W Connection, and the champions of the 2012–13 Pro League, Defence Force.

The Savonetta Boys secured the Charity Shield for the second consecutive year after defeating the Teteron Boys 4–2 at the Hasely Crawford Stadium. The match witnessed a goal spree in the second forty-five minutes after the two teams combined for six goals during the second-half. Hashim Arcia opened the scoring in the 46th minute before Richard Roy leveled for Defence Force two minutes later. However, a goal each from Silvio Spann and Stefano Rijssel secured the win for W Connection. After scoring in the 70th minute from a penalty kick, Arcia was awarded the Man of the Match for recording a brace.

Pre-match

Entry

W Connection qualified by winning the 2013 Digicel Pro Bowl, defeating North East Stars 4–3 in a penalty shoot-out after the final match ended scoreless at Hasely Crawford Stadium. W Connection claimed victories over Caledonia AIA 3–1 and Defence Force 1–1 (4–3) en route to the final. The 2013 Pro Bowl was the Teteron Boys''' third Pro Bowl title and consequently gained a berth in the 2013 Digicel Charity Shield.

Defence Force qualified for their first Charity Shield by clinching the TT Pro League title on 6 May 2013. After suffering from their largest defeat of the season at the hands of W Connection 4–0, the Teteron Boys'' claimed the title following a loss from second-placed Caledonia AIA to Central FC in Couva. Defence Force started their season off the pace set by Pro League newcomers Central FC with just one win from their first three matches. However, after recording four consecutive victories, the combined air and coast guard club climbed to level on points with Caledonia AIA following the first round of fixtures. Defence Force recorded an additional four consecutive wins that included an undefeated run of twelve matches to give the club a four-point lead after the second round. The club would never relinquish their lead and secured their second title in three seasons and marked their third Pro League title overall.

Match

Details

Man of the match
 Hashim Arcia (W Connection)

Match rules
90 minutes
Penalty shoot-out if scores level after 90 minutes
Seven named substitutes
No maximum on number of substitutions

See also
 2012–13 TT Pro League
 2013 Digicel Pro Bowl

References

2013
Charity Shield